Servants' Entrance is a 1934 American Pre-Code musical comedy film. It was written by Samson Raphaelson from the Sigrid Boo novel and directed by Frank Lloyd, with a cartoon sequence by Walt Disney (whose company now owns this film due to their 2019 Acquisition of Fox) in which an understandably startled Janet Gaynor sings a song while obstreperous animated singing silverware prance around on her bed, an early example of combining live action with animation. Critics found this musical interlude especially charming.

This film was adapted from Sigrid Boo's 1930 Norwegian novel Vi som går kjøkkenveien ("We Who Enter Through the Kitchen") which has an almost identical plot to Eleanor Hoyt Brainerd's popular 1917 novel How Could You, Jean?, which had already been adapted into a film of the same name in 1918, directed by William Desmond Taylor and starring Mary Pickford. Servants' Entrance plot was strikingly identical to that of the earlier film; as the New York Times commented, "apparently, the old Pickford comedy was already forgotten, and no copyright infringement suit was filed."

An earlier film based on Sigrid Boo's novel was Servant's Entrance (1932), directed by Gustaf Molander in Sweden. The Swedish version starred Tutta Rolf, who became contracted to Fox Film in 1935.

Cast
Janet Gaynor as Hedda Nilsson/Helga Brand
Lew Ayres as Erik Langstrom
Ned Sparks as Hjalmar Gnu
Walter Connolly as Viktor Nilsson
Louise Dresser as Mrs. Hanson
Astrid Allwyn as Sigrid Hanson
Sig Ruman as Hans Hansen
John Qualen as Detective
Catherine Doucet as Anastasia Gnu

References

External links

1934 films
1934 musical comedy films
Fox Film films
American black-and-white films
American films with live action and animation
American musical comedy films
American remakes of Swedish films
1930s English-language films
Maids in films
Films based on Norwegian novels
Films directed by Frank Lloyd
Films directed by Walt Disney
1930s American films